Kamp-Lintfort is a town in Wesel District, in North Rhine-Westphalia, Germany.

Notable people
Adolf Storms (1919–2010), member of the Waffen-SS and war criminal
Werner Fuchs (1927–2005), painter
Brigitte Asdonk (born 1947), founding member of the Red Army Faction

Twin towns – sister cities

Kamp-Lintfort is twinned with:

 Edremit, Turkey
 Żory, Poland
 Chester-Le-Street, England
 Cambrai, France

Climate
Köppen-Geiger climate classification system classifies its climate as oceanic (Cfb). It lies within the Rhine-Ruhr area which is characterized by having the warmest winters in Germany.

References

Towns in North Rhine-Westphalia
Wesel (district)